Muyuka is a town in the Fako Division on the Southwest Province of Cameroon. It is originally home to members of the Balong tribe, but over the years Muyuka has expanded. It is the headquarters for sub villages and towns such as Owe, Ekata, Bafia, Muyenge, Yoke, Malende, Meanja and Mpundo.

History
Muyuka had suffered from the colonial masters especially during the period of slavery and slave trade. This is one of the areas in Cameroon where slavery and slave trade was intense.

Education
Muyuka is home to popular educational establishments such as FESS Technical and Commercial College (FETECOL), Vocational College of Arts, Science and Technology (VOCAST), Government Bilingual High School (GBHS), Efuetngu Memorial comprehensive College and Government Technical High School (GTHS) of Muyuka. It used to be host of the Electricity Corporation (POWERCAM) in the days of the Federal Cameroon before it became the United Republic of Cameroon in 1972.

Religion

With regard to religion, churches such as the Roman Catholic Mission, the Presbyterian Church, the Full Gospel Mission, Apostolic Church, the Baptist Church, and the Muslim Mosque, are the dominant places of worship in Muyuka.

Politics

Politically, Muyuka used to be a stronghold of the chief opposition party, the Social Democratic Front (SDF) since 1990 but it later fell into the hands of the ruling CPDM during the past few years.

Geography

Ecologically, the soil in Muyuka is of a rich volcanic nature (black), because Muyuka is located at the foot of Mount Cameroon, known for its volcanic nature.

Demographics

Although the indigenes are the Balongs, there is a significant population of the Bangwas from Lebialem Division who have migrated to Muyuka, engaged in agriculture and politics. Muyuka can boast of supplying a significant quantify of foodstuff and tertiary crops like cocoa and coffee into the local market.

Features

There are a good number of state institutions in Muyuka like the Divisional Office, the Police, the Gendarmerie, a Government Hospital, a post office, the Court of First Instance (commonly known as a Magistrate's Court), a Legal Department, and most if not all of the Ministries. These office are not far away from one another since Muyuka is a small town along the Kumba-Douala road.

In the private sector, there are local banks including a community bank known as MC2.

Sports
Muyuka is home to football clubs like Aljazeera Soccer Academy who play in the Southwest Regional League, Ekona United
And has a good Football venue the Heroes Field

Communes of Southwest Region (Cameroon)